The Embassy of Russia in Washington, D.C. is the diplomatic mission of the Russian Federation to the United States. The chancery is located at 2650 Wisconsin Avenue, Northwest, Washington, D.C. The embassy oversees consulates in New York and Houston.

Ambassador's residence

The Russian ambassador's residence is located at 1125 16th Street, Northwest, Washington, D.C. Built in 1910, this Beaux-Arts mansion served variously as the Russian or Soviet embassy during periods of established relations between 1913 and 1994.

New embassy compound on Wisconsin Avenue
The Russian embassy is situated on "Mount Alto" on Wisconsin Avenue Northwest, built on property leased to the Soviet government for 85 years on the basis of an agreement between the Soviet Union and the United States, concluded in 1969. Under the 1972 agreement, equivalent territory in Moscow was to be leased to the United States for a new embassy on the same conditions. The second agreement also stated that both sides should start using their new buildings simultaneously.

The embassy was designed by well-known Soviet architect , who designed the State Kremlin Palace and a number of other buildings in Moscow. The residential building, the school, the kindergarten and sports grounds were all complete in 1979. Administrative and ceremonial buildings were finished in 1985.

In the late 1980s, the FBI and the National Security Agency built a tunnel under the compound for espionage purposes, but it was never successfully exploited due to FBI agent Robert Hanssen disclosing information about the operation to the KGB.

In September 1994, during his visit to the United States, Russian President Boris Yeltsin and U.S. President Bill Clinton inaugurated the new ceremonial building of the Russian Embassy, at Mount Alto.

Events
In 1985, Vitaly Yurchenko redefected here, after eluding his handlers at the Au Pied de Cochon restaurant in Georgetown.

On February 27, 2018, a one-block section of Wisconsin Avenue in front of the embassy was renamed Boris Nemtsov Plaza in honor of Boris Nemtsov, an opposition activist and vocal critic of Russian President Vladimir Putin who was shot dead by assassins while walking on a bridge near the Kremlin on February 27, 2015. The move to rename the street was initiated by Senator Marco Rubio, who commented that the renaming serves as "an enduring reminder to Vladimir Putin and those who support him that they cannot use murder and intimidation to suppress dissent."

Gallery

See also
 The Permanent Mission of the Russian Federation to the United Nations in New York
 Russian Embassy School in Washington, D.C.
 List of diplomatic missions of Russia
 Soviet Union–United States relations
 Russia–United States relations
 Embassy of the United States, Moscow
 Amtorg
 Soviet Government Purchasing Commission in the U.S.
 List of ambassadors of Russia to the United States

References

External links

  Embassy of Russia in Washington
 wikimapia
 Ambassador's residence wikimapia
 New Embassy Washington, DC

Washington, D.C.
Russia
Russia–United States relations
Soviet Union–United States relations
Russian-American culture in Washington, D.C.